This is a list of seasons played by Sporting Cristal in Peruvian and South American football, from 1951 (the year of the club's first participated in the Peruvian Primera División) to the most recent completed season. Sporting Cristal was founded in December, 1951,  in the Rímac district by engineer Ricardo Bentín Mujica and his wife Esther Grande de Bentín, owners of the Peruvian brewery Backus and Johnston.

The club has won the Peruvian Primera División twenty times, has finished as Copa Libertadores runner-up once, and has never been relegated from Peru's top division.

This list details the club's achievements in all major competitions, and the top scorers for each season (where the information is available). Top scorers in bold were also the top scorers in the Peruvian Primera División that season.

Key

Key to colors and symbols

Key to league record
 Season = The year and article of the season
 League = League name
 Pld = Games played
 W = Games won
 L = Games lost
 D = Games drawn
 GF = Goals for
 GA = Goals against
 GD = Goal difference
 Pts = Points
 Pos = Regular season position
 Play-offs = Play-offs position

Key to national cups record
 — = Competition not held or canceled
 DNE = Did not enter
 DNQ = Did not qualify
 QR = Qualifying round
 PR = Preliminary round
 GS = Group stage
 R1 = First round
 R2 = Second round
 R3 = Third round
 R4 = Fourth round
 R5 = Fifth round
 Ro16 = Round of 16
 QF = Quarter-finals
 SF = Semi-finals
 F = Final
 RU = Runners-up
 W = Winners

Seasons

Professional Era (1951-1965)

National Championship Era (1966–present)

Notes

References
Specific

General
 
 

 
 
Sporting Cristal